The Conservation Council of South Australia, also known as Conservation SA and Conservation Council SA, is an environmental organisation serving as a peak body, representing over 50 member groups, representing over 90,000 individual members, in the state of South Australia.

Description
The Council is an independent, non-profit and strictly non-party political organisation, established to "give a voice to the growing environmental challenges that face us and the emerging solutions showing the way to the future". It informs the public and government on key environmental issues and participates in government and community processes that seek to restore and protect the natural environment. The Council liaises with industry, government departments, unions, community organisations and all political parties. By nominating individuals to sit on government committees such as the EPA Board, the Pastoral Board, and the Lake Eyre Basin Community Advisory Committee, the Council provides the community with opportunities for direct input into government decision-making.

, there were 50 member groups. Combined, these groups represent over 90,000 South Australians with the common goals being the conservation and protection of the environment and a sustainable future.

Jill Hudson Award
The Conservation Council of South Australia presents the Jill Hudson Award for Environmental Excellence annually. Past recipients have included Jillian Marsh (1998) David Noonan, Joel Catchlove & Sophie Green, Richard Owen, the Kupa Piti Kunga Tjuta Aboriginal Corporation, Kevin Buzzacott, Anne Daw (2013) and Mark Parnell (2004).

The Joinery

In early 2015 Conservation SA moved its headquarters to the disused former interstate bus terminal building in Franklin Street, owned by the Adelaide City Council, creating a community environment space called The Joinery. The building houses offices sublet to other environmental and sustainability related organisations, groups and businesses, and a former carpark area has been converted to a community garden shared with the community housing group Common Ground.

Member groups 

, there are over 50 member groups represented on the Council:

 Aldgate Valley Landcare Group Inc
 Aldinga Bay Coastcare Inc
 Anti Nuclear Coalition
 Australian Association for Environmental Education SA
 Australian Conservation Foundation
 Australian Electric Vehicle Association
 Australian Institute of Landscape Architects (SA Group)
 Australian Nuclear Free Alliance
 Australian Plants Society (SA Region) Inc
 Australian Youth Climate Coalition SA
 Bike Adelaide
 Birds SA
 Brownhill Creek Association Inc
 CEDAMIA (Climate Emergency Declaration and Mobilisation in Action)
 Cheltenham Park Residents Association Inc
 Citizens Own Renewable Energy Network Australia
 Clean Bight Alliance Australia
 Community Alliance SA Inc
 Eco-Action KI
 Economic Reform Australia Inc
 Extinction Rebellion SA
 Field Naturalists Society of SA
 Fishers for Conservation
 Fossil Free SA
 Friends of Gulf St Vincent
 Friends of Parks
 Friends of the Earth Adelaide Inc
 Friends of Willunga Basin
 Gawler Environment & Heritage Association Inc
 Greening Australia (SA)
 Landcare Association of SA Inc
 Landscape Partnerships Inc
 Limestone Coast Protection Alliance
 National Trust of South Australia
 Nature Conservation Society of SA
 North East Hills Environmental Conservation Association
 Nuclear Operations Watch Port Adelaide
 Orienteering SA Inc
 Outdoors SA
 People for Public Transport
 Permaculture Association of SA Inc
 Port Adelaide Residents Environment Protection Group
 Rise Up Singing
 River, Lakes & Coorong Action Group Inc
 SA Genetic Food Information Network Inc
 SA Herpetology Group Inc
 Scientific Expedition Group Inc
 St Agnes Bushwalking & Natural History Club Inc
 Sustainable Communities SA Inc
 Sustainable Population Australia SA Branch
 Tennyson Dunes Group
 Toyota Landcruiser Club of Australia (SA)
 The Wilderness Society (South Australia) Inc
 Trees For Life
 Vegetarian & Vegan Society (VegSA) Inc
 Walking SA
 West Mallee Protection Group
 Western Adelaide Coastal Residents’ Association
 Wombats SA
 Zoos SA

See also
Conservation Council of Western Australia
Environment Victoria
Queensland Conservation Council

References

External links
 Conservation Council of South Australia

Environmental organisations based in Australia
Organisations based in South Australia
Environment of South Australia